Leo Daniel Brongersma (17 May 1907 in Bloemendaal, North Holland – 24 July 1994 in Leiden) was a Dutch zoologist, herpetologist, author, and lecturer.

Brongersma was born in Bloemendaal, North Holland, and earned his PhD at the University of Amsterdam in 1934. He was probably best known for his scientific paper, "European Atlantic Turtles", which was published in 1972, but he also served as the director of the Natural History Museum, Leiden and lectured at Leiden University until he retired at age 65. In the 1950s he led several expeditions to collect zoological specimens in New Guinea. He described many new reptile species from the Indo-Australian Archipelago and New Guinea. He was also a Member of the Royal Netherlands Academy of Arts and Sciences since 1952 and an Honorary Foreign Member of the American Society of Ichthyologists and Herpetologists. He died at his home in Leiden in 1994.

Amphibian and reptile taxa described by Brongersma
Species and subspecies are listed in the order they were described. Only species and subspecies still recognized are listed. A taxon author in parentheses indicates that the species or subspecies was originally described in a different genus.

Gehyra leopoldi  – Leopold's dtella
Hemiphyllodactylus margarethae  – Sumatran dwarf tree gecko
Scinax proboscideus  – Gran Rio snouted treefrog
Cyrtodactylus papuensis  – Papuan bow-fingered gecko
Nactus vankampeni  – Van Kampen's bow-fingered gecko
Ramphotyphlops similis  – Manokwari blindsnake
Ramphotyphlops supranasalis  –  Salawati blindsnake
Typhlops koekkoeki  – Bunyu Island blindsnake
Sphenomorphus necopinatus  – Bogor forest skink
Sphenomorphus vanheurni  – Van Heurn's forest skink
Cyrtodactylus deveti  – Moluccan bow-fingered gecko
Tropidonophis multiscutellatus    – long-tailed keelback
Lipinia venemai  – Venema's moth skink
Morelia boeleni  – Boelen's python
Liasis mackloti savuensis  – Sawu Island python
Cryptophis boschmai  – Carpentaria whipsnake

Amphibian and reptile species named in Brongersma's honour
Species are listed in the order they were described. Only species still recognized are listed.

Phrynobatrachus brongersmai  – Boulenger's African river frog
Python brongersmai  –  Malaysian blood python, red blood python
Litoria brongersmai  – Snow Mountains treefrog
Calamaria brongersmai  – Brongersma's reed snake
Trimeresurus brongersmai  – Brongersma's pitviper
Bufo brongersmai  – Brongersma's toad
Eremiascincus brongersmai  – Brongersma's night skink, Brongersma's tree skink
Lobulia brongersmai   – Brongersma's highland skink, Brongersma's lobulia
Amerotyphlops brongersmianus  – Brongersma's worm snake
Tribolonotus brongersmai  – Admiralty crocodile skink, Brongersma's helmet skink
Emoia brongersmai  – Brongersma's emo skink

References

External links
Nationaal Herbarium Nederland
Marine Turtle Newsletter: Leo Brongersma – an Appreciation

1907 births
1994 deaths
People from Bloemendaal
20th-century Dutch zoologists
Dutch herpetologists
Members of the Royal Netherlands Academy of Arts and Sciences
University of Amsterdam alumni
Academic staff of Leiden University